Cañoncito or Canoncito may refer to the following places in the U.S. state of New Mexico:
Cañoncito, Bernalillo County, New Mexico
Canoncito, Mora County, New Mexico
Cañoncito, Rio Arriba County, New Mexico
Canoncito, San Miguel County, New Mexico
Cañoncito, Santa Fe County, New Mexico
Cañoncito, Taos County, New Mexico
The Tohajiilee Indian Reservation, formerly known as the Canoncito Indian Reservation